Meher is an Indian Hindi television Soap opera which aired on DD National from 3 January 2004 to 27 January 2006.

Plot
The story revolves around Meher and Irfan's difficulty as they attempt a loving relationship. But Meher's bhabhi Billkis is jealous of Meher. She separates Meher and Irfan. Irfan marries Naseem and Meher marries Shezad. Later, Meher gets a chance to rejoin Irfan. At that time Rukshana, the family foe, enters Meher's life. She has dark past:  She stole Meher's twin sister Shabana and raised her according to her evil wishes. She uses Shabana as a pawn. Then, Shabana destroys Meher's marital life by killing Irfan. Meher continues her struggle, leads a straight life, and eventually her life improves. Shabana suffers the consequences of her own evil deeds. She tries to murder Meher, but accidentally hurts herself. Shabana dies and Meher survives.

Cast 
 Payal Nair in dual roles as 
Meher: Shabana's twin sister - Married to shehzad later divorced ;Irfan's wife; Zayed's wife after Irfan's death
Shabana: Meher's twin sister- (Aman's estranged wife ;Irfan's fake wife;Zayed's former wife and Obsessive lover);
 replaced by Shilpa Shinde as Meher/Naz
 Ujjwal Rana as Zayed Khan-Husband of Shabana and Meher ;Brother of Irfan
 Buddhaditya Mohanty as Irfaan,- Elder brother of Zayed;Naseem's ex-husband later divorced; Meher's husband but later killed by Shabana and Rukhshana 
 Indraneel Bhattacharya as Aman -Shabana's loyal Husband 
 Neena Cheema as Shaheen Begum, -Meher's and Shabana's Mother 
 Shahab Khan as Irfaan's Mamu
Chetanya Adib as Eijaz -(Meher's first Brother;Mehfooz elder brother;Bilkkis husband)
Anjali Mukhi as Bilkkis Bhabhi -(Meher'and Mehfooz First Bhabhi ;Eijas wife;Naseem's elder sister 
 Sumeet Pathak as Mehfooz -(Meher second Brother;Eijaz younger brother ;Sadia's husband)
 Vineeta Thakur as Sadia -(Meher's Second Bhabhi;Mehfooz's wife)
 Sonica Handa  as Naseem -Bilkkis younger sister,Irfaan ex-wife
Rishina Kandhari as Dr.Nigar-(Zayed's friend)
Rajeev Paul as Shehzad -Meher's first husband

Reception
The series opened with 7 TVR occupying eighteen position in the debut week. The following week it garnered an average of 7.2 with a peak of 8.4 TVR.

References

External links

2004 Indian television series debuts
2006 Indian television series endings
DD National original programming
Indian television soap operas
UTV Television